West-Veluws is a Low Saxon dialect of the Dutch province of Gelderland. It is spoken in several Veluwe municipalities and villages including: Nunspeet, Putten, Ermelo (Armelo), Harderwijk (Harderwiek), Uddel, Nijkerk (Niekark), Appel, Scherpenzeel (Schaarpezeel), the municipality of Barneveld (Barreveld) and some villages of the municipality of Ede.

West-Veluws is also spoken in the Utrecht village of Bunschoten (Bunsjoten) and originally in Leusden and Amersfoort as well, but here the dialect has almost died out. The border between West-Veluwe in the northeast and Utrecht and South Gelderland in the southwest is very frayed: even the dialects of, for instance, Soest, Eemnes, Huizen and Laren still have Lowlands Saxon characteristics. In the articles Goois, Eemlands and Geldersevalleis these transitional dialects are discussed in more detail.

Speakers
West-Veluws is mainly spoken by older people, the Low Saxon dialect is not very popular among the youth. This is true, incidentally, of many other areas in the Netherlands where dialects are largely being exchanged for Standard Dutch. The majority of the Veluwe youth today speak Standard Dutch, but there are still young people who speak the dialect from home, but often with more of a Dutch influence than their parents and grandparents. There is also a small number of second language speakers. In general, West-Veluws is fairly easy to understand for people whose mother tongue is Standard Dutch; the further north or east one goes, the more difficult it becomes for a speaker of Standard Dutch. On the whole, within the West-Veluwe language area, more dialect is spoken in the northern places than in the southern ones.

After the Second World War, Nijkerk developed into a commuter town for Amersfoort, an almost dialect-free city, so that the dialect-speaking community is strongly outnumbered. In fact, this situation applies to the entire border region of Utrecht and Gelderland, except for Bunschoten-Spakenburg. Places like Elburg and Oldebroek, on the other hand, lie deeper in the Lower Saxon language area, adjacent to the Salland and East Veluwe language area, where the dialect has a much larger place.

Dictionary of the dialects of Gelderland 
The last part called Veluwe. De wereld. van het Woordenboek van de Gelderse dialecten (WGD) was published on 7 November 2008. This dictionary series includes words from West Veluwe, East Veluwe, Urkers and dialects from surrounding areas. A version for the river area of Gelderland is also available. In October 2005, the first volume Veluwe. Het huis van Harrie Scholtmeijer appeared and in November 2006, the second part Veluwe. De mens uit.

Earlier, registration of local dialects has taken place on a small scale, for example in Putten, Nijkerk, Scherpenzeel, Bunschoten, Nunspeet and a book for the entire North-West Veluwe.

Spelling
Until recently, there was no standardised spelling for the Veluws dialect. However, the IJsselacademie has developed a spelling for the Overijssel and Veluwe dialects that is largely consistent with Standard Dutch and the other Low Saxon language varieties. Often people still use their own spelling, one of the reasons being that many people are unaware of the existence of the IJsselacademy spelling.

Features
A characteristic of Western Veluws is that it is a kind of transition area between Lowlands Saxon and Standard Dutch; the more northerly a place is situated, the smaller the Standard Dutch influence and the greater the Lower Saxon influence usually becomes. Veluws is usually considered Lower Saxon, since in terms of vocabulary and grammar it is more in line with Lower Saxon than with Standard Dutch, therefore it is originally a real Lower Saxon dialect. West-Veluws has different words and pronunciations per village, so in Nijkerk they say brocht and verlore/veleure, in Putten and Bunschoten brocht and verleuren and in Nunspeet bröch and verleuren (brachten (brought) and verloren (lost) in Standard Dutch).

Sounds
In West-Veluws, the vowel phenomena are strongly influenced by Dutch, more specifically the Hollandic dialects of the seventeenth century. West-Veluws shares this influence with Oost-Veluws, Sallaans, Stellingwarfs and Drèents, where these languages contrast with the more conservative Tweants and Achterhooks. However, the Dutch influence in West-Veluws is more far-reaching. Characteristic of West Veluws is the Dutch ou, which in other dialects is pronounced as ol (e.g. houwen instead of holden); in the border region with Oost-Veluws (e.g. in Nunspeet), these forms are sometimes both used, as well as houwen (to keep/hold), zollen (would). The Dutch ui is almost always pronounced as uu (so muus, huus etc.), however, there are a few exceptions such as: fluit(e), buis(e), spuit(e).

Examples

Dialect comparison

Notes

Other dialects

Noten

Grammar
In verbs, West-Veluws uses the Dutch suffix -en instead of the original Low Saxon -t, the West-Veluws variant having been blown over from (North) Hollandic with the Hollandic expansion. In Oost-Veluws, for example, one says wie denkt (who thinks) and wie heurt (who hears), while West-Veluws uses wie/wulie denken and wie/wulie heuren; this phenomenon also occurs in Stellingwarfs. There are also some differences between them, for example Nunspeets has more Oost-Veluws characteristics. For example, 'cheese' in Putten is keis or kees and in Nunspeet keze (or: kêeze) which is the same as in East Veluwe.

References

Languages of the Netherlands
Dutch Low Saxon
Culture of Gelderland
Culture of Utrecht (province)